The Diocese of Sinnuara (in Latin : Dioecesis Sinnuaritana) is a sede soppressa and titular see of the Roman Catholic Church. The bishopric is suffragan to the Archdiocese of Carthage.

The diocese was during the Roman Empire centered on a town called Sinnuara, in the Roman province of Africa Proconsularis. That town is now lost  but was in what is today Tunisia.

There are two documented bishops of this diocese: 
The Catholic bishop, Stefano, who attended the Council of Carthage (411). It seem the city did not have at Donatist bishops at that time.
 Bishop Paul, who took part in the synod called in Carthage in 484 by the Vandal king Huneric, after which Paul was exiled. 
 Today Sinnuara survives as titular bishopric and the current bishop is Felipe González González, Vicar Apostolic of Caroní.

Known bishops of Sinnuara
Stefano (fl. 411) 
Paul (fl. 484) 
Julio Xavier Labayen (1966–1978) 
Kurongku (1978–1981)
Patras Yusaf (1981–1984) 
Felipe González González, since 25 November 1985.

References

Roman towns and cities in Tunisia
Archaeological sites in Tunisia
Ancient Berber cities
Populated places in Tunisia
Catholic titular sees in Africa